WASP-67 is a K-type main-sequence star about 620 light-years away. The stars age is poorly constrained, but is likely older than the Sun`s at approximately  billion years (ie. somewhere between 100 million years and the age of the universe).  WASP-67 is slightly depleted in heavy elements, having 85% of the solar abundance of iron.

Nonetheless, follow-up observations in 2017 failed to find any bound stellar companions.

Planetary system
In 2012 a transiting hot Jupiter planet b was detected on a tight, circular orbit.

The planetary atmosphere contains water, and a cloud layer is located higher than in the similar gas giant HAT-P-38b, indicating a high planetary metallicity.

References

Sagittarius (constellation)
K-type main-sequence stars
Planetary systems with one confirmed planet
Planetary transit variables
J19425852-1956585